Burren Junction is a New South Wales village 51 km west of Wee Waa, on the Kamilaroi Highway to Walgett. The name is from the local Aboriginal word for boomerang or 'big creek'. Burren Junction grew from a railway encampment which came from the extension of the north-western rail line in 1902.
Burren Junction Post Office opened on 16 May 1904.

Burren Junction is in the Walgett Shire local government area and Jamison County.
Wheat and cotton growing are the main agricultural industries along with some sheep and beef cattle breeding.

The town has two churches, RSL and Sporting Club (now closed), sports ground, plus a hotel. The Burren Junction Bore is a hot mineral water pool complex that is floodlit to provide day and night bathing that is popular with tourists but is now shunned by the locals who consider it ruined by the Walgett Shire Council.  The bore baths at Lightning Ridge remain the same.

There is also a pool, park and tennis court used for recreation. The tennis court is in poor condition, with only one of the three in passable condition. There used to be an annual tennis tournament in Burren Junction, however, this stopped in the 1980s. One method used to get the long weekend tennis tournament finished after rain was to fly a helicopter above the courts to dry the surface.

A Bachelor and Spinster Ball was held each year in Burren Junction, with people travelling from all over Australia to enjoy a night of fun and entertainment but had to be cancelled due to excessive insurance costs.

In 2006 the first Australian record of a grey-headed lapwing was made at Burren Junction, this migratory bird native to Eurasia was observed by passing birdwatchers in a field near the silos. The sighting attracted large numbers of birdwatching visitors from all over Australia for the duration of the bird's presence.

References

"Lightning Ridge, Walgett and District", Walgett Shire Council, 2000

External links

 https://web.archive.org/web/20060912003451/http://www.wheretostay.net/article.htm?qa=burrenjunction

Towns in New South Wales
Walgett Shire